The Skagen railway line is a  long standard gauge single track railway line between Skagen and Frederikshavn in Vendsyssel, Denmark. The railway links the fishing port and seaside resort of Skagen with the Danish rail network.

The railway line opened as a narrow gauge railway in 1890 and was converted to standard gauge in 1924. It is currently owned and operated by the railway company Nordjyske Jernbaner (NJ) which runs frequent local train services from Skagen station to Frederikshavn station with onward connections from Frederikshavn to the rest of Denmark.

History
Work on the railway line started on 26 July 1889, and was completed on 16 March 1890. It was opened on 24 July 1890 in the presence of King Christian IX, Crown Prince Frederick, and the Interior Minister Hans Peter Ingerslev. Operations on the line commenced the following day with two trains daily in each direction.

In 1924 the railway line was converted to standard gauge to avoid the need to transfer cargoes of fish in Frederikshavn. As a consequence of the conversion, the layout of Skagen station was extensively changed. As part of the conversion, the right-of-way between Frederikshavn and Rimmen halt was changed so the railway line passed by the coastal town of Strandby instead of the inland village of Elling.

In 2001, the operating company Skagensbanen A/S (SB) merged with Hjørring Privatbaner A/S (HP) to form the railway company Nordjyske Jernbaner (NJ). With headquarters in Hjørring, the company is now responsible for running the Hjørring–Hirtshals and Frederikshavn–Skagen lines.

In 2005 the current Siemens Desiro was introduced.

Route

The Skagen line runs north from Frederikshavn, following the tracks of the Vendsyssel Line out of the city. As the Vendsyssel Line branches west towards Hjørring, the Skagen Line continues north following the curve of the coast line of the Ålbæk Bay, serving the towns of Strandby, Jerup and Ålbæk. From Ålbæk the line continues north, passing through Bunken Plantation, Hulsig Heath and Skagen Plantation before passing through the western part of Skagen to reach its terminus in central Skagen.

Operations

Local trains

The railway company Nordjyske Jernbaner (NJ) operating in the North Jutland Region runs frequent local train services from Skagen station to Frederikshavn station with onward connections from Frederikshavn to Aalborg and the rest of Denmark.

InterCity service
For a period in the 1990s there were direct InterCity connections between Copenhagen and Skagen, operated by DSB.

Bus services
In 2005, NJ replaced the bus connections between Skagen and Frederikshavn with more frequent train connections.

Stations

Previous stations
Højen station — between Frederikshavnsvej Halt and Hulsig Station.
Sandmilen halt — between Højen Station and Hulsig Station
Elling station — between Rimmen Halt and Frederikshavn Station.
Apholmen halt — between Strandby Station and Frederikshavn Station.

See also
List of railway lines in Denmark
List of gauge conversions
Hirtshalsbanen

References

Citations

Bibliography

Further reading

External links

 Nordjyske Jernbaner – Danish railway company operating in North Jutland Region
 Danske Jernbaner – website with information on railway history in Denmark
 Nordjyllands Jernbaner – website with information on railway history in North Jutland
 Skagensiden.dk – website with information on Skagen

Railway lines in Denmark
Railway lines opened in 1890
1890 establishments in Denmark
Metre gauge railways in Denmark
Rail transport in the North Jutland Region
Skagen